Demetrius Calip (November 18, 1969 – February 5, 2023) was an American professional basketball player for the Los Angeles Lakers of the NBA. Born in Flint, Michigan, he helped the University of Michigan Wolverines to the 1989 Men's Division I Basketball Championship. As a member of the 1988–1989 National Champions, his teammates included Glen Rice, Terry Mills, Loy Vaught, Rumeal Robinson, Sean Higgins, and Rob Pelinka. As a member of the 1990–91 team he led the team in scoring, assists and minutes. Other Michigan teammates included Eric Riley and Gary Grant.

Calip appeared in the basketball-themed films Blue Chips (1994) and Eddie (1996).

Calip died on February 5, 2023 at age 53.

Notes

External links
Demetrius Calip Statistics at BasketballReference.com

College stats at sportsstats.com
University of Michigan Basketball Statistical Archive

1969 births
2023 deaths
American expatriate basketball people in Mexico
American male film actors
American men's basketball players
Basketball players from Flint, Michigan
Columbus Horizon players
Los Angeles Lakers players
Male actors from Michigan
Mexico Aztecas players
Michigan Wolverines men's basketball players
Point guards
Rapid City Thrillers players
Undrafted National Basketball Association players
Yakima Sun Kings players